Team (foaled 8 September 1995) is an Argentinian Thoroughbred racehorse. He was named both the 1998 Argentinian Horse of the Year as well as 1998 Argentinian Champion Two-Year-Old Colt for a campaign during which he won five graded stakes races. Team regularly won by multiple lengths and set two national speed records, at distances of 800 and 1000 meters.

Background 
Team was a solid dark bay bred by La Quebrada, sired by perennial Argentinian leading sire Southern Halo out of the winning mare Teocrática. He was the last of four foals produced by the cross. None of the other full siblings had a race career of note. Hernán Ceriani Cernadas, owner of La Quebrada, said that Team's time at his stud was unremarkable, and that he never expected the colt to become a champion. Racing owners Stud Las Telas purchased him from La Quebrada for under $30,000 ARS. Team was trained initially by Colucho Juan, but was later trained by Pavarini Hector after his first race as a three-year-old.

Racing career

1997-1998: two-year-old season 
Team's racing career began November 29, 1997 in a 800-meter allowance race run at Hipódromo Argentino de Palermo. He went off at odds of 1.85, beating 13 others, to win by 10 lengths in 0:43.39, setting an Argentinian speed record for the distance that stood until 2002. A month later, on December 28, Team won another 800 meter allowance race by 8 lengths. Team's first stakes race was the Group III Gran Premio Congreve over 1000 meters on February 18, 1998. It was also his first race on turf, with his two prior starts being on dirt, as well as his first start at a different racetrack, Hipódromo de San Isidro. The 1.10 favorite, Team won by four lengths in 0:54.86. He won the Group II Gran Premio Guillermo Kemmis on March 13, winning the 1000 meter race by nine lengths with a time of 0:54.43, once again setting a national record, which lasted until 2000.

Team's first Group I race was the Gran Premio Santiago Luro at a distance of 1200 meters. Team won by 10 lengths at odds of 1.20.  Team won his second Group I in the Gran Premio Montevideo over 1500 meters, with a winning margin of 9 lengths. Team's last race at age two was the Group I Carreras de las Estrellas Juvenile on June 15, 1998 at Hipódromo Argentino de Palermo. Team won the race by six lengths in a time of 1:34.53 for the 1600 meters.

Team's final record at two was seven wins in seven starts, earning him end year honors as both the Champion Two-Year-Old Colt and as Horse of the Year in Argentina. In all of his races at two, he was ridden by Arreguy Francisco.

1998-1999: three-year-old season 
Team's first start at three was the Group I Gran Criterium over 1600 meters, in which he finished second by three-quarters of a length to Señor Juez as the co-favorite at 1.10. After this race, Team was transferred to a new trainer, Pavarini Hector. It was also the last time that he was ridden by Arreguy Francisco. Team's next race was the Group I Dos Mil Guineas, the first race in the San Isidro Triple Crown and run over 1600 meters on the turf. Starting as the 1.15 favorite, Team finished fifth of eleven runners under new jockey Herrera Jacinto Rafael, who also rode him in his next start. Team's last race at three, and the last of his career, was the Group I Gran Premio Polla de Potrillos, first race in the Argentinian Triple Crown and run over 1600 meters on the dirt. At odds of 1.50, Team finished second to fellow co-favorite Chevillard by three-quarters of a length.

Race Record

Retirement 
After the Gran Premio Polla de Potrilos, Team was retired from racing and sent to stand stud at Haras Firmamento for the 1998 Southern Hemisphere breeding season. There, he covered four mares, but only managed to get one pregnant. No registered foal was produced. The decision was made to return Team to race training, despite a crack in his right front hoof. Both of his front legs became injured, resulting in his being euthanized early in the morning January 19, 1999.

Pedigree

References 

Racehorses bred in Argentina
Thoroughbred family 1-w
1995 racehorse births
2000 racehorse deaths
Racehorses trained in Argentina
Argentine racehorses